Walter Brown (9 February 1927 – 31 October 2013) was a New Zealand film and television actor. He was born Ian Walter Brown in Auckland, New Zealand on 9 February 1927.

Selected filmography
 Information Received (1961) - Vic Farlow
 The Frightened City (1961) - Billy Agnew
 Locker Sixty-Nine (1962) - Craig
 Mix Me a Person (1962) - Max Taplow
 Gideon's Way TV series episode "To Catch a Tiger" (1964) - John Borgman
 Two Letter Alibi (1962) - Mark Richards
 Devils of Darkness (1965) - Bruno
 The Brigand of Kandahar (1965) - Hitala
 Dracula: Prince of Darkness (1966) - Brother Mark
 Some May Live (1967) - Maj. Matthews
 Shalako (1968) - Pete Wells
 The Best House in London (1969) - Mr. Barrett
 Farmer & Chase (1997) - Bank Police #1
 True Crime (1999) - Beechum Family Member (final film role)

References

External links

1927 births
2013 deaths
People from Auckland
New Zealand male film actors